Mountain Stream is an early 20th century watercolor drawing by the American artist John Singer Sargent. Done in watercolor and graphite pencil on wove paper, the work depicts a nude figure by a dazzling mountain stream. Sargent's work was donated to the Metropolitan Museum of Art, where it remains, as part of the bequest of Joseph Pulitzer in 1915.

References 

Paintings in the collection of the Metropolitan Museum of Art
Watercolor paintings
Paintings by John Singer Sargent